The Wind River is a minor tributary of the Mississippi River in western Wisconsin in the United States. It flows for its entire  length in western Pierce County. It rises in the town (unincorporated jurisdiction) of Trimbelle and flows southward through the towns of Oak Grove and Diamond Bluff. Wind River joins the Mississippi near the unincorporated community of Diamond Bluff, which is within the larger jurisdiction (the town).

See also
List of Wisconsin rivers

References

Rivers of Pierce County, Wisconsin
Rivers of Wisconsin
Tributaries of the Mississippi River